Likak (also Romanized as Līkak; also known as Lakak, Līrkak and Lak Lak; also, Līkak-e Bahmanī (لیکک بهمنی); also, Qaleh Likak (meaning Fort Likak, قَلعِۀ ليكَك) also Romanized as Qal‘eh-i-Likak and Qal‘eh-ye Līkak; also Seh Laklak) is a city in and the capital of Bahmai County, Kohgiluyeh and Boyer-Ahmad Province, Iran. At the 2006 census, its population was 12,226, in 2,201 families.

References

Populated places in Bahmai County

Cities in Kohgiluyeh and Boyer-Ahmad Province